A repast is a meal or taking of food.
Repast may also refer to:
 Repast (film), a 1951 film directed by Mikio Naruse
 Repast (magazine), a quarterly food history magazine
 Repast (modeling toolkit), a computer software toolkit